Daviesia alternifolia is a species of flowering plant in the family Fabaceae and is endemic to the south-west of Western Australia. It is a dense, spreading shrub with scattered, egg-shaped phyllodes with the narrower end towards the base, and orange and red flowers with a greenish-yellow centre.

Description

Taxonomy and naming
Daviesia alternifolia was first formally described in 1838 by Stephan Endlicher in the journal Annalen des Wiener Museums der Naturgeschichte. The specific epithet (alternifolia) means "alternate-leaved".

Distribution and habitat
This species of pea mainly grows in open forest on flats, hillsides and swamps mainly in the Stirling Range, but also near Denmark and Cheyne Beach in the Esperance Plains, Jarrah Forest and Mallee biogeographic regions in the south-west of Western Australia.

Conservation status
Daviesia alternifolia is classified as "not threatened" by the Government of Western Australia Department of Biodiversity, Conservation and Attractions.

References

alternifolia
Eudicots of Western Australia
Plants described in 1838
Taxa named by Stephan Endlicher